Tang Yuemei (born 1931) is a Chinese translator of Chinese Vietnamese ethnicity. Tang was a visiting professor at Yokohama City University. She is most notable for being one of the main translators into Chinese of the works of the Japanese novelists Yukio Mishima and Takiji Kobayashi.

Biography
Tang was born into a Chinese Vietnamese family in Cholon, French Indo-China in 1931, with her ancestral home in Hainan. In 1956, Tang graduated from Peking University, where she majored in Japanese at the Department of East Language and Literature. After graduation, Tang was appointed to the Chinese Academy of Social Sciences. In 1966, the Cultural Revolution was launched by Mao Zedong, Tang and her husband Ye Weiqu's whole collection of books was burned by the Red Guards, the couple were sent to the May Seventh Cadre Schools to work in Henan. In 1976, Hua Guofeng and Ye Jianying toppled the Gang of Four, the couple were rehabilitated by Deng Xiaoping, at the same time, they started to study Japanese literature. Tang started to publish works in 1978 and she joined the China Writers Association in 1982.

Works
 The History of Japanese Drama
 The Sound of Waves (Yukio Mishima)
 The Temple of the Golden Pavilion (Yukio Mishima)
 The Sea of Fertility (Yukio Mishima)
 Confessions of a Mask (Yukio Mishima)
 Thirst for Love (Yukio Mishima)
 (Yukio Mishima)
 (Toyoko Yamasaki)
 The History of Japanese Literature (Toyoko Yamasaki)
 Karei-naru Ichizoku (Toyoko Yamasaki)
 The Old Capital (Takiji Kobayashi)
 (Takiji Kobayashi)
 (Takiji Kobayashi)
 The House of the Sleeping Beauties (Takiji Kobayashi)

Awards
 Karei-naru Ichizoku – 1st National Book Award
 Chinese Translation Association – Competent Translator (2004)

Personal life
In 1956, Tang married her middle school sweetheart Ye Weiqu in Beijing, he was also a translator.

References

1931 births
People from Ho Chi Minh City
Hoa people
Vietnamese emigrants to China
Peking University alumni
People's Republic of China translators
Japanese–Chinese translators
Living people
20th-century translators
21st-century translators